Termez Airport  is an airport serving Termez, a city in southern Uzbekistan. It was used as a base for German Air Force C-160 "Transalls" which were part of the German ISAF-contingent.

Airlines and destinations

See also
List of the busiest airports in the former USSR
Transportation in Uzbekistan

References

External links
 
 

Airports in Uzbekistan
Surxondaryo Region